Kerndombie is a remote rural locality and civil parish of Yungnulgra County in far North West New South Wales.

Geography
Kerndombie located at 30°57′19″S 142°49′25″E is between Mutawintji National Park and the nearest town, Whitecliffs to the south east. The Parish has an arid landscape.

Climate
The parish has extremely hot summers and mild winters. The parish has a Köppen climate classification of BWh (Hot desert),. is almost unpopulated, with less than two inhabitants per square kilometer.

References

Localities in New South Wales